Carlos Curbelo (born 28 April 1954 in San José de Mayo, Uruguay) is a former naturalised French footballer who played as a defender.

He is the father of AS Nancy's Gaston Curbelo.

External links
 
 
 Profile on French federation official site 
 

1954 births
Living people
People from San José de Mayo
French people of Uruguayan descent
Naturalized citizens of France
French footballers
France international footballers
C.A. Cerro players
Ligue 1 players
AS Nancy Lorraine players
OGC Nice players
Association football defenders
Uruguayan footballers